Solae may refer to:

Solae (tower), an elevator testing tower in Inazawa City, Japan
Solae (company), Solae LLC, a joint venture between DuPont and Bunge Limited
The five solae, foundational principles of the Protestant Reformation